Keiko McDonald (January 1, 1940 – September 14, 2008) was an American orientalist.

Biography 
Keiko McDonald was born in Nara, Japan on January 1, 1940.

In 1963, McDonald graduated from Osaka University of Foreign Studies with a degree in English. She received an MA in English from the State University of California-Sacramento in 1966. Later attending the University of Oregon where she received her Doctor of Arts in 1971 and a PhD in 1974.

After graduation in 1974, McDonald became a visiting assistant professor at the University of Texas-Austin before joining the faculty as an assistant professor at the University of Pittsburgh in 1972 where she taught Japanese cinema, literature, culture and language in the Department of East Asian Languages and Literatures. In 1992, she became a professor and in 2007 served as acting chair. As a scholar of Japanese film, she was renowned internationally and was one of the few who was located in the United States. In 1999, McDonald received the Toshiba International Grant, Tina and David Bellet CAS Undergraduate Teaching Excellence Award in 2002, three Fulbright Research Fellowships and a National Endowment for the Humanities Summer Research Award.

McDonald died on September 14, 2008 while on a sabbatical from teaching when she fell and struck her head fishing.

Bibliography 
 Cinema East: a critical study of major Japanese films, 1983
 Reading a Japanese Film: Cinema in Context, 2006. Outstanding Academic Title by Choice magazine.

References 

1940 births
2008 deaths
University of Oregon alumni
University of Pittsburgh faculty
People from Nara, Nara
Osaka University alumni
Japanese emigrants to the United States
California State University, Sacramento alumni
University of Texas at Austin faculty